The Northern Isles are a pair of archipelagos off the north coast of mainland Scotland, comprising Orkney and Shetland. They are part of Scotland, as are the Hebrides. The climate is cool and temperate and much influenced by the surrounding seas. There are a total of 36 inhabited islands. The landscapes of the fertile agricultural islands of Orkney contrast with the more rugged Shetland islands to the north, where the economy is more dependent on fishing and on the oil wealth of the surrounding seas.  Both island groups have a developing renewable energy industry.  Both have a Pictish and Norse history. Both were part of the Kingdom of Norway until they were absorbed into the Kingdom of Scotland in the 15th century. They remained part of it until the 1707 formation of the Kingdom of Great Britain and the 1801 formation of the United Kingdom. They both played a significant naval role during the world wars of the 20th century.

Tourism is important to both archipelagos, and there are regular ferry and air connections between them and with mainland Scotland. Their distinctive prehistoric ruins play a key role in their attraction for tourists. The Scandinavian influence remains strong, especially in local folklore, and the place-names of the islands are dominated by their Norse heritage, although some may retain pre-Celtic elements. Both island groups have strong, although distinct, local cultures.

Geography

The phrase "Northern Isles" generally refers to the main islands of the Orkney and Shetland archipelagos. The Island of Stroma, which lies between mainland Scotland and Orkney, is part of Caithness, so for local government purposes it falls under the jurisdiction of the Highland council area, rather than that of Orkney. It is nevertheless clearly one of the "northern isles" of Scotland. Fair Isle and Foula are outliers of Shetland, but would normally be considered part of Shetland, and thus of the Northern Isles. Similarly, Sule Skerry and Sule Stack, although distant from the main group, are part of Orkney, and therefore technically amongst the Northern Isles. However, the other small islands that lie off the north coast of Scotland are in Highland, and are thus not usually considered to be part of the Northern Isles.

Orkney has 20 inhabited islands and Shetland has 16.

Its total population in 2001 was 19,245, and its largest town is Kirkwall. Lerwick, the capital and largest settlement, has a population of around 7,500. About half of the archipelago's total population of 22,000 people live within  of the town.

Geology

The superficial rock of Orkney is almost entirely Old Red Sandstone, mostly of Middle Devonian age. As in the neighbouring mainland county of Caithness, this sandstone rests upon the metamorphic rocks of the Moine series. This can be seen on the Orkney Mainland, where a narrow strip of the older rock is exposed between Stromness and Inganess, and also on the small island of Graemsay.

Middle Devonian basaltic volcanic rocks are found on western Hoy, on Deerness in eastern Mainland and on Shapinsay. A correlation between the Hoy volcanics and the other two exposures has been proposed, but because of differences in their chemical makeup, this remains uncertain. Lamprophyre dykes of Late Permian age are found throughout Orkney. Glacial striation and the presence of chalk and flint erratics that originated from the bed of the North Sea demonstrate the influence of ice action on the geomorphology of the islands. Boulder clay is also abundant, and moraines cover substantial areas.

The geology of Shetland is quite different from that of Orkney. It is extremely complex, with numerous faults and fold axes. The Shetland Islands are the northern outpost of the Caledonian orogeny, and there are outcrops of Lewisian, Dalriadan and Moine metamorphic rocks whose histories are similar to those of their counterparts on the Scottish mainland. There are also small Old Red Sandstone deposits and granite intrusions. Shetland's most distinctive geological feature is the ultrabasic ophiolite, peridotite and gabbro on Unst and Fetlar, which are remnants of the Iapetus Ocean floor. There are oil-bearing sediments in the surrounding seas, on which much of Shetland's economy depends.

Climate

The Northern Isles have a cool, temperate climate that is remarkably mild and steady for such a northerly latitude, due to the influence of the surrounding seas and the Gulf Stream. The frost-free period may be as short as 3 months.

Winds are a key feature of the climate. In summer, there are almost constant breezes. In winter, there are frequent strong winds: Orkney has an average of 52 hours of gales annually. The Burradale wind farm in Shetland, which operates with five Vestas V47 660 kW turbines, achieved a world record of 57.9% capacity over the course of 2005 due to the persistent strong winds.

Snowfall is usually confined to the period of November to February and seldom lies on the ground for more than a day. In Shetland there are 1082 hours of bright sunshine per year, on average, and overcast days are common.

To tourists, one of the fascinations of the islands is their "nightless" summers. On the longest day in Shetland there are over 19 hours of daylight, and it never gets completely dark. The long twilight is known in the Northern Isles as the "simmer dim". Winter nights are correspondingly long, with less than six hours of daylight at midwinter. At this time of year the aurora borealis can occasionally be seen on the northern horizon during moderate auroral activity.

Prehistory

There are numerous important prehistoric remains in Orkney, especially from the Neolithic period. Four of these remains comprise the Heart of Neolithic Orkney UNESCO World Heritage Site (designated as such in 1999). They are: Skara Brae; Maes Howe; the Stones of Stenness; and the Ring of Brodgar. The Knap of Howar Neolithic farmstead on the island of Papa Westray is probably the oldest preserved house in northern Europe. This structure was inhabited for 900 years, beginning around 3700 BC, but it had evidently been built on the site of an even older settlement. The Shetland Islands are also extremely rich in physical remains from prehistoric eras: They contain a total of over 5,000 archaeological sites. It is known as Funzie Girt. But it is the Iron Age that has provided the most outstanding archaeology in Shetland. Numerous brochs were erected during that period. The finest preserved example of these distinctive round towers is the Broch of Mousa. In 2011, a site known as "the Crucible of Iron Age Shetland", which includes the Broch of Mousa, Old Scatness and Jarlshof, joined the UK's "Tentative List" of World Heritage Sites.

History, culture and politics

Pictish times
The culture that built the brochs is unknown, but by the late Iron Age the Northern Isles had become part of the Pictish kingdom. The most common archaeological relics from that period are symbol stones. One of the best examples of these stones is on the Brough of Birsay: It depicts three warriors with spears and sword scabbards, as well as characteristic Pictish symbols. In 1958, a trove of silver metalwork, known as the St Ninian's Isle Treasure, was discovered. The silver bowls, jewellery and other pieces it contains are believed to date from around 800 AD.  According to O'Dell (1959), "The treasure is the best survival of Scottish silver metalwork from the period .... [T]he brooches show a variety of typical Pictish forms, with both animal-head and lobed geometrical forms of terminal".

Christianity probably arrived in Orkney in the 6th century, and organised church authority emerged in the 8th century. An Ogham–inscribed artefact known as the Buckquoy spindle-whorl was found at a Pictish site on Birsay. There has been controversy about its origin and meaning, but it is now generally considered to be of Irish Christian origin.

Norse era

The 8th century was also the time when the Vikings started invading the Scottish seaboard. They brought to the Northern Isles a new culture and a new language; rendering the fate of the existing indigenous peoples uncertain. According to the Orkneyinga Saga, Vikings then made the islands the headquarters of the pirate expeditions they carried out against Norway and the coasts of mainland Scotland. According to some sources, in 875, the Norwegian king Harald Hårfagre ("Harald Fair Hair") annexed the Northern Isles and gifted Orkney and Shetland to Rognvald Eysteinsson as an earldom in recompense for the death of his son in battle in Scotland. (Some scholars believe this story is apocryphal and is based instead on events connected with the later voyages of Magnus III of Norway, known as Magnus Barelegs.)

In 995, King Olaf I of Norway (Olav Tryggvasson) fully Christianised the islands by fiat, when he stopped in South Walls on his way from Ireland to Norway. The king summoned the jarl Sigurd the Stout and said, "I order you and all your subjects to be baptised. If you refuse, I'll have you killed on the spot and I swear I will ravage every island with fire and steel." Unsurprisingly, Sigurd agreed, and the islands became Christian at a stroke. In the early 11th century, they received their own bishop (the Bishop of Orkney).

Annexation by Scotland

In the 14th century, Orkney and Shetland remained a Norwegian province, but Scottish influence was growing. Jon Haraldsson, who was murdered in Thurso in 1231, was the last of an unbroken line of Norse jarls, and thereafter the earls were Scots noblemen of the houses of Angus and St. Clair. In 1468 Shetland was pledged by Christian I, in his capacity as King of Norway, as security against the payment of the dowry of his daughter Margaret, betrothed to James III of Scotland. As the money was never paid, the connection with the crown of Scotland became permanent. In 1470 William Sinclair, 1st Earl of Caithness ceded his title to James III and the following year the Northern Isles were directly annexed to Scotland.

17th, 18th and 19th centuries
From the early 15th century on the Shetlanders had sold their goods through the Hanseatic League of German merchantmen. This trade with the North German towns lasted until the 1707 Act of Union when high salt duties prohibited the German merchants from trading with Shetland. Shetland then went into an economic depression as the Scottish and local traders were not as skilled in trading with salted fish. However, some local merchant-lairds took up where the German merchants had left off, and fitted out their own ships to export fish from Shetland to the Continent. For the independent farmer/fishermen of Shetland this had negative consequences, as they now had to fish for these merchant-lairds.

British rule came at a price for many ordinary people as well as traders. The Shetlanders' nautical skills were sought by the Royal Navy: some 3,000 served during the Napoleonic Wars from 1800 to 1815 and press gangs were rife. During this period 120 men were taken from Fetlar alone and only 20 of them returned home. By the late 19th century 90% of all Shetland was owned by just 32 men, and between 1861 and 1881 more than 8,000 Shetlanders emigrated. With the passing of the Crofters' Act in 1886 the Liberal prime minister William Gladstone emancipated crofters from the rule of the landlords. The Act enabled those who had effectively been landowners' serfs to become owner-occupiers of their own small farms.

The Orcadian experience was somewhat different. An influx of Scottish entrepreneurs helped to create a diverse and independent community that included farmers, fishermen and merchants that called themselves comunitatis Orcadie and who proved themselves increasingly able to defend their rights against their feudal overlords. In the 17th century, Orcadians formed the overwhelming majority of employees of the Hudson's Bay Company in Canada. The harsh climate of Orkney and the Orcadian reputation for sobriety and their boat-handling skills made them ideal candidates for the rigours of the Canadian north. During this period, burning kelp briefly became a mainstay of the islands' economy. Agricultural improvements beginning in the 17th century coincided with the enclosure of the commons and in the Victorian era the emergence of large and well-managed farms using a five-shift rotation system and producing high-quality beef cattle. There is little evidence of an Orcadian fishing fleet until the 19th century but it grew rapidly and 700 boats were involved by the 1840s with Stronsay and then later Stromness becoming leading centres of development. Many Orcadian seamen became involved in whaling in Arctic waters during the 19th century, although the boats were generally based elsewhere in Britain.

World Wars

Orkney was the site of a naval base at Scapa Flow, which played a major role in World War I. After the Armistice in 1918, the German High Seas Fleet was transferred in its entirety to Scapa Flow while a decision was to be made on its future; however, the German sailors opened the sea-cocks and scuttled all the ships. During World War I the 10th Cruiser Squadron was stationed at Swarbacks Minn in Shetland and during a single year from March 1917 more than 4,500 ships sailed from Lerwick as part of an escorted convoy system. In total, Shetland lost more than 500 men, a higher proportion than any other part of Britain, and there were waves of emigration in the 1920s and 1930s.

One month into World War II, the Royal Navy battleship  was sunk by a German U-boat at Scapa Flow. As a result, barriers were built to close most of the access channels; these had the advantage of creating causeways enabling travellers to go from island to island by road instead of being obliged to rely on ferries. The causeways were constructed by Italian prisoners of war, who also constructed the ornate Italian Chapel. The Scapa Flow base was neglected after the war, eventually closing in 1957.

During World War II, a Norwegian naval unit nicknamed the "Shetland Bus" was established by the Special Operations Executive in the autumn of 1940 with a base first at Lunna and later in Scalloway to conduct operations around the coast of Norway. About 30 fishing vessels used by Norwegian refugees were gathered, and the Shetland Bus conducted covert operations, carrying intelligence agents, refugees, instructors for the resistance, and military supplies. It made over 200 trips across the sea, with Leif Larsen, the most highly decorated allied naval officer of the war, making 52 of them.

The problem of a declining population was significant in the post-war years, although in the last decades of the 20th century there was a recovery and life in the islands focused on growing prosperity and the emergence of a relatively classless society.

Modern times

Politics
Due to their history, the islands have a Norse, rather than a Gaelic flavour, and have historic links with the Faroes, Iceland, and Norway. The similarities of both geography and history are matched by some elements of the current political process. Both Orkney and Shetland are represented in the House of Commons as constituting the Orkney and Shetland constituency, which elects one Member of Parliament (MP), the current incumbent being Alistair Carmichael. Both are also within the Highlands and Islands electoral region for the Scottish Parliament.

In the 2014 Scottish independence referendum, 65.4% of the constituency’s electors voted for Scotland to stay part of the United Kingdom.

However, there are also two separate constituencies that elect one Member of the Scottish Parliament each for Orkney and Shetland by the first past the post system. Orkney and Shetland also have separate local Councils which are both dominated by independents.

The Orkney Movement, a political party that supported devolution for Orkney from the rest of Scotland, contested the 1987 general election as the Orkney and Shetland Movement (a coalition of the Orkney movement and its equivalent for Shetland). Their candidate, John Goodlad, came 4th with 3,095 votes, 14.5% of those cast.

Transport

Ferry services link Orkney and Shetland to the rest of Scotland, the main routes being Scrabster harbour, Thurso to Stromness and Aberdeen to Lerwick, both operated by NorthLink Ferries. Inter-island ferry services are operated by Orkney Ferries and SIC Ferries, which are operated by the respective local authorities and Northlink also run a Lerwick to Kirkwall service. Automatic lighthouses are commonly sited across the islands as an aid to navigation at various locations.

Kirkwall Airport serves as the sole commercial airport in Orkney, which is operated by Highland and Islands Airports. Loganair provides services to Aberdeen, Edinburgh, Glasgow and Inverness for both Kirkwall and Sumburgh Airport.

Inter-Island flights are available from Kirkwall to several Orkney islands and from the Shetland Mainland to most of the inhabited islands including those from Tingwall Airport.  There are frequent charter flights from Aberdeen to Scatsta near Sullom Voe, which are used to transport oilfield workers and this small terminal has the fifth largest number of international passengers in Scotland. The scheduled air service between Westray and Papa Westray is reputedly the shortest in the world at two minutes' duration.

Economics
The very different geologies of the two archipelagos have resulted in dissimilar local economies. In Shetland, the main revenue producers are agriculture, aquaculture, fishing, renewable energy, the petroleum industry (offshore crude oil and natural gas production), the creative industries and tourism. Oil and gas was first landed at Sullom Voe in 1978, and it has subsequently become one of the largest oil terminals in Europe. Taxes from the oil have increased public sector spending in Shetland on social welfare, art, sport, environmental measures and financial development. Three-quarters of the islands' workforce is employed in the service sector and Shetland Islands Council alone accounted for 27.9% of output in 2003. Fishing remains central to the islands' economy today, with the total catch being  in 2009, valued at over £73.2 million.

Orkney and Shetland have significant wind and marine energy resources, and renewable energy has recently come into prominence. The European Marine Energy Centre is a Scottish Government-backed research facility that has installed a wave testing system at Billia Croo on the Orkney Mainland and a tidal power testing station on the island of Eday. This has been described as "the first of its kind in the world set up to provide developers of wave and tidal energy devices with a purpose-built performance testing facility." Billia Croo also houses an experimental underwater data center run by Microsoft.

Culture

The Northern Isles have a rich source of folklore. There are many Orcadian tales concerning trows, a form of troll that draws on the islands' Scandinavian connections. Local customs in the past included marriage ceremonies at the Odin Stone that forms part of the Stones of Stenness.
The best known literary figures from modern Orkney are the poet Edwin Muir, the poet and novelist George Mackay Brown and the novelist Eric Linklater.

Shetland has a strong tradition of local music. The Forty Fiddlers was formed in the 1950s to promote the traditional fiddle style, which is a vibrant part of local culture today. Notable exponents of Shetland folk music include Aly Bain and the late Tom Anderson and Peerie Willie Johnson.  Thomas Fraser was a country musician who never released a commercial recording during his life, but whose work has become popular more than 20 years after his untimely death in 1978.

Language
The Norn language, formerly spoken in the islands, is descendant of Old Norse brought by the Vikings in the 9th century. Since 1468-1469, after Orkney and Shetland were absorbed by the Kingdom of Scotland, Norn gradually began to fade as the influx of Scots-speaking settlers migrated to the islands. Norn as such became an extinct language around 1850, after the death of its last-known speaker Walter Sutherland. The local dialects of the Scots language, collectively known as Insular Scots, are distinctive and retain strong Nordic influences.

Island names
The etymology of the island names is dominated by Norse influence. There follows a listing of the derivation of all the inhabited islands in the Northern Isles.

Shetland
The oldest version of the modern name Shetland is Hetlandensis recorded in 1190 becoming Hetland in 1431 after various intermediate transformations. This then became Hjaltland in the 16th century. As Shetland's Norn was gradually replaced by Scots Hjaltland became . When use of the letter yogh was discontinued, it was often replaced by the similar-looking letter z, hence Zetland, the mispronounced form used to describe the pre-1975 county council. However the earlier name is Innse Chat – the island of the cats (or the cat tribe) as referred to in early Irish literature and it is just possible that this forms part of the Norse name. The Cat tribe also occupied parts of the northern Scottish mainland – hence the name of Caithness via the Norse Katanes ("headland of the cat"), and the Gaelic name for Sutherland, Cataibh, meaning "among the Cats".

The location of "Thule", first mentioned by Pytheas of Massilia when he visited Britain sometime between 322 and 285 BC is not known for certain. When Tacitus mentioned it in AD 98 it is clear he was referring to Shetland.

Orkney

Pytheas described Great Britain as being triangular in shape, with a northern tip called Orcas. This may have referred to Dunnet Head, from which Orkney is visible. Writing in the 1st century AD, the Roman geographer Pomponius Mela called the Orkney islands Orcades, as did Tacitus in AD 98 "Orc" is usually interpreted as a Pictish tribal name meaning "young pig" or "young boar". The old Irish Gaelic name for the islands was Insi Orc ("island of the pigs"). The ogham script on the Buckquoy spindle-whorl is also cited as evidence for the pre-Norse existence of Old Irish in Orkney. The Pictish association with Orkney is lent weight by the Norse name for the Pentland Firth – Pettaland-fjörðr i.e "Pictland Firth.

The Norse retained the earlier root but changed the meaning, providing the only definite example of an adaption of a pre-Norse place name in the Northern Isles. The islands became Orkneyar meaning "seal islands". An alternative name for Orkney is recorded in 1300—Hrossey, meaning "horse isle" and this may also contain a Pictish element of ros meaning "moor" or "plain".

Unlike most of the larger Orkney islands, the derivation of the name "Shapinsay" is not obvious. The final 'ay' is from the Old Norse for island, but the first two syllables are more difficult to interpret. Haswell-Smith (2004) suggests the root may be hjalpandis-øy (helpful island) due to the presence of a good harbour, although anchorages are plentiful in the archipelago. The first written record dates from 1375 in a reference to Scalpandisay, which may suggest a derivation from "judge's island". Another suggestion is "Hyalpandi's island", although no one of that name is known to have been associated with Shapinsay.

Uninhabited islands
Stroma, from the Norse Straumøy means "current island"
or "island in the tidal stream", a reference to the strong currents in the Pentland Firth. The Norse often gave animal names to islands and these have been transferred into English in, for example, the Calf of Flotta and Horse of Copinsay. Brother Isle is an anglicisation of the Norse breiðareøy meaning "broad beach island". The Norse holmr, meaning  "a small islet" has become "Holm" in English and there are numerous examples of this use including Corn Holm, Thieves Holm and Little Holm. "Muckle" meaning large or big is one of few Scots words in the island names of the Nordreyar and appears in Muckle Roe and Muckle Flugga in Shetland and Muckle Green Holm and Muckle Skerry in Orkney. Many small islets and skerries have Scots or Insular Scots names such as Da Skerries o da Rokness and Da Buddle Stane in Shetland, and Kirk Rocks in Orkney.

See also
 Kingdom of the Isles

References
Notes

Footnotes

General references
 Armit, Ian (2006) Scotland's Hidden History. Stroud. Tempus. 
 Ballin Smith, B. and Banks, I. (eds) (2002) In the Shadow of the Brochs, the Iron Age in Scotland. Stroud. Tempus. 
 Clarkson, Tim (2008) The Picts: A History. Stroud. The History Press. 
 
 Gammeltoft, Peder (2010) "Shetland and Orkney Island-Names – A Dynamic Group". Northern Lights, Northern Words. Selected Papers from the FRLSU Conference, Kirkwall 2009, edited by Robert McColl Millar.
 General Register Office for Scotland (28 November 2003) Occasional Paper No 10: Statistics for Inhabited Islands. Retrieved 22 January 2011.
 Gillen, Con (2003) Geology and landscapes of Scotland. Harpenden. Terra Publishing. 
 Keay, J. & Keay, J. (1994) Collins Encyclopaedia of Scotland. London. HarperCollins. 
 
 Omand, Donald (ed.) (2003) The Orkney Book. Edinburgh. Birlinn. 
 Nicolson, James R. (1972) Shetland. Newton Abbott. David & Charles.
 Sandnes, Berit (2003) From Starafjall to Starling Hill: An investigation of the formation and development of Old Norse place-names in Orkney. (pdf) Doctoral Dissertation, NTU Trondheim.
 Sandnes, Berit (2010) "Linguistic patterns in the place-names of Norway and the Northern Isles" Northern Lights, Northern Words. Selected Papers from the FRLSU Conference, Kirkwall 2009, edited by Robert McColl Millar.
 Schei, Liv Kjørsvik (2006) The Shetland Isles. Grantown-on-Spey. Colin Baxter Photography. 
 Shetland Islands Council (2010) "Shetland in Statistics 2010" (pdf) Economic Development Unit. Lerwick. Retrieved 6 March 2011
 Thomson, William P. L. (2008) The New History of Orkney Edinburgh. Birlinn. 
 Turner, Val (1998) Ancient Shetland. London. B. T. Batsford/Historic Scotland. 
 Wickham-Jones, Caroline (2007) Orkney: A Historical Guide. Edinburgh. Birlinn. 
 Watson, W. J. (1994) The Celtic Place-Names of Scotland. Edinburgh. Birlinn. . First published 1926.

 
Archipelagoes of the Atlantic Ocean
Scottish toponymy
Archipelagoes of Scotland